Ferhat Akdeniz (born October 26, 1986 in Switzerland) is a Turkish volleyball player. He is 203 cm and plays as middle blocker. He plays for Fenerbahçe S.K.

References

1986 births
Living people
Turkish men's volleyball players
Galatasaray S.K. (men's volleyball) players
21st-century Turkish people